Dirty dog exercise or hip side lifts or fire hydrant exercise is an exercise that is meant to strengthen the hips and buttocks, without the use of weights. It is so named due to resemblance to the way a dog urinates.
The exercise also improves core stability.

References

Physical exercise
Bodyweight exercises
Aerobic exercise